Smiths Hill is a hill in Sussex County, New Jersey. It is located in the Kittatinny Valley of the Appalachian Mountains.

References 

Landforms of Sussex County, New Jersey
Hills of New Jersey
Hampton Township, New Jersey